Yoon Taek-young (Korean:윤택영, Chinese:尹澤榮, 1876-24 October 1935) was an official of Joseon and Korean Empire. He was father of Empress Sunjeonghyo and father in law of Sunjong of Korea.

Biography 
Yoon Taek-young was born in 1876 in Seoul. He was a member of Yoon was educated in his home. On 1 March 1899, Yoon was appointed as one of the officials in the section of Crown Prince education. On 15 June 1900, Yoon was appointed as member of Junchuwon. He served as Haeminwon Chongmu, and Vice minister of Justice. As an official, Yoon was not an honest one. While he served as Haeminwon Chongmu, he earned unjust money. When Empress Sunmyeong died in the age of 33, Yoon's daughter was selected as the next wife of Crown Prince, and his house was selected as the place of Crown Prince's wedding.

After being the father in law of Crown prince, Yoon was appointed as Ji donryeong sa-sa on 12 January 1907. On 19 April 1907, Yoon was appointed as Major General with Yi Jae-gak and Yi Gi-hong. On 27 August 1907, after Sunjong became the emperor, Yoon was appointed as Haepung Buwon Prince. On 31 August, he was appointed as Yeongdonneyoung Sisa. Yoon tried to visit Hague for Hague Conventions of 1907 in order to assert the independence of Korea. He asked help for a Russian. The Russian said that there was no way to help Yoon, changing his mind. On 3 September 1907, Yoon was removed from his military rank, which was Lieutenant General. Yoon agreed with annexation of Korea and donated 20 Won to People Speech Organization, which supported the colonization of Korea by Ye Wanyong on 14 December 1909.

After the colonization, Yoon was ennobled as Marquise. During Korea under Japanese rule, Yoon had a lot of debts. He fled to Beijing. When Sujong died, Yoon returned Korea. Yoon was mocked by Koreans for having a lot of debts even being a traitor. He died in Beijing on 24 October 1935. Yun Chi-ho assessed Yoon should have been less greedy about being rich. And because of this, he investigated a lot in different areas, which made him to have a tremendous amount of debts.

Reference 

1876 births
1935 deaths
Korean collaborators with Imperial Japan
Lieutenant generals of Korean Empire
19th-century Korean people
20th-century Korean people
Recipients of the Order of the Plum Blossom
Joseon Kazoku